Dichobunidae is an extinct  family of basal artiodactyl mammals from the early Eocene to late Oligocene of North America, Europe, and Asia.  The Dichobunidae include some of the earliest known artiodactyls, such as Diacodexis.

Description
They were small animals, averaging about the size of a modern rabbit, had many primitive features. In life, they would have resembled a long-tailed muntjac or chevrotain. Dichobunids had four or five toes on each foot, with each toe ending in a small hoof. They had complete sets of teeth, unlike most later artiodactyls, with their more specialist dentitions. The shape of the teeth suggests they were browsers, feeding on small leaves, perhaps in the forest undergrowth. The shape of their bodies and limbs suggests they would have been fast-running animals, unlike most of their contemporaries.

Taxonomy
Classification of dichobunids following McKenna and Bell:

† Family Dichobunidae
Paraphenacodus
Dulcidon
Chorlakkia
Pakibune
Pakkokuhyus
Progenitohyus
Subfamily Dichobuninae
Tribe Hyperdichobunini
Mouillacitherium
Hyperdichobune
Tribe Dichobunini
Aumelasia
Meniscodon
Messelobunodon
Dichobune
Buxobune
Neufferia
Metriotherium
Synaphodus
Subfamily Eurodexeinae
Eurodexis
Eygalayodon
Lutzia
Parahexacodus
Subfamily Diacodexeinae
Diacodexis
Bunophorus
Protodichobune
Tapochoerus
Neodiacodexis

References

Dichobunids
Eocene even-toed ungulates
Oligocene even-toed ungulates
Eocene first appearances
Chattian extinctions
Prehistoric mammal families